Sinclair Secondary School is located in Whitby, Ontario. Opened in 1994, it is home to nearly 2000 students and over 100 teaching staff. Serving both Special Education and French Immersion students, the school is recognized for its strong academic reputation and remains the highest ranked school in the Durham Region, according to the Fraser Institute's Ontario Secondary School Report Card program.

Notable alumni and faculty
Delroy Clarke (born 1982), Faculty, Canadian football player
Aaron Milton (born 1992), Alumni, Canadian football player
Ana Padurariu (born 2002), Alumni, Canadian artistic gymnast, 2018 world not-first place medalist on beam
Karl Svoboda (born 1963), Faculty, formal professional Canadian rugby player

Notable Clubs and Committees of SSS

DECA (Sinclair Chapter) 
One of Sinclair Secondary's most established, largest, and most recognized clubs is its DECA chapter. Founded in the early 2010s, by Hussein Yassin and Rupica Sudan the club has grown exponentially over the years to amass a membership of over 120 students who compete in DECA business competitions both in Canada and the United States. Being the host school for the Nor-Eastern regionals, the chapter is well-known for its organizational abilities and overall DECA spirit. The chapter regularly sends teams of both written and oral competitors to the International Career Development Conference (ICDC) held in the United States. Sinclair Secondary's chapter is very well known in the social sphere of DECA Ontario for its competitive members and their efforts in various events such as the CSP. Their efforts Community Service Project (CSP) in the year of 2015-2017 with the team of Young and Ma saw huge non-profit work and donations made for Muscular Dystrophy Canada and collectively raised several thousands of dollars for the non-profit. Additionally, in the year of 2016-2017, the team of Myers contributed over 400 hours of community service work and over two thousand pounds of food donations for Feed the Need in Durham (Non-profit food bank and warehouse). Both of the aforementioned teams progressed to the international stage of DECA competition at the ICDC events in both Orlando, Fl, and Anaheim, Ca, where they presented their work contributed to both of their causes. The chapter has its well-known advisers of Kristie Lee and Raymond Scarlet who are large influences on how the chapter is ran and on how the Nor-Eastern regional events are held annually.

Gender Sexuality Alliance (GSA) 
Sinclair Secondary's GSA is very well known in the Durham Region for its pride events and efforts made to benefit the LGBTQ community of not only the secondary school, but also the Durham region. The club’s former president, Mackenzie Mumby, was the driving force behind the opening of the first gender-neutral washroom in the Durham District School Board (DDSB) in 2016, which allowed transgender and non-binary students to have a safe washroom space which was not present anywhere in the school district before its appearance. The club and the Gender Studies classes in the school, work together to hold annual pride-days at the school and are the main administration behind the Pink-shirt week that the school hosts annually.

References

High schools in the Regional Municipality of Durham
1994 establishments in Ontario
Educational institutions established in 1994
Education in Whitby, Ontario